Andrew Kratzmann (born 3 November 1971 in Murgon, Queensland, Australia) is a former professional male tennis player from Australia.

Kratzmann turned professional in 1990 and was known as a doubles specialist, often partnering his brother Mark.

Kratzmann teamed up with Roger Federer in the men's doubles at Wimbledon in 2000. They got to the quarter finals before losing to Paul Haarhuis and Sandon Stolle. They also played together at the US Open in 2000 but were knocked out by Wayne Arthurs and Nenad Zimonjić.

Junior Grand Slam finals

Doubles: 1 (1 runner-up)

ATP career finals

Doubles: 21 (9 titles, 12 runners-up)

ATP Challenger and ITF Futures finals

Singles: 1 (0–1)

Doubles: 14 (8–6)

Performance timelines

Singles

Doubles

Mixed doubles

References

External links
 
 

1971 births
Living people
Australian male tennis players
People from Wide Bay–Burnett
Tennis people from Queensland